Samuel Lee Tillen (born 16 April 1985) is an English professional footballer, most notable for his eight years in as a left back in Icelandic football with Fram and FH. He also played in the Football League for Brentford. Tillen was capped by England at U19 level and represented the Football League at U21 level.

Club career

Chelsea 
A left back, Tillen joined the academy at Premier League club Chelsea at the age of 12. He completed a scholarship and signed his first professional contract in 2002, but his progress was hindered by 17 months out with a stress fracture in his back and a torn anterior cruciate ligament. Tillen progressed to the reserve team, but despite an injury crisis at full back in the first team ranks in late in February 2005, he did not receive a call into the first team squad before departing Stamford Bridge at the end of the 2004–05 season.

Brentford 
On 27 May 2005, Tillen joined League One club Brentford on a one-year contract, with a one-year option. He was a regular in the promotion-chasing team throughout the 2005–06 season and manager Martin Allen took up the option on his contract in February 2006. Tillen finished the 2005–06 season with 43 appearances and experienced the disappointment of defeat to Swansea City in the play-off semi-finals. In July 2006, he signed a new undisclosed-length contract.

Tillen was again a regular under new manager Leroy Rosenior early in the 2006–07 season and retained his place after Rosenior was sacked and replaced with Scott Fitzgerald in November 2006. He scored the first senior goal of his career with a late equaliser to secure a 1–1 draw with Leyton Orient on 9 September 2006. Brentford suffered relegation to League Two at the end of the 2006–07 season and Tillen finished the campaign with 38 appearances and one goal. Aside from two early 2007–08 season substitute appearances, Tillen was frozen out of the first team squad by new manager Terry Butcher and failed to break back in after Butcher was replaced by Andy Scott in December 2007. On 10 January 2008, Tillen departed Brentford after his contract was cancelled by mutual consent. During two-and-a-half seasons at Griffin Park, Tillen made 83 appearances and scored one goal.

Fram 
In February 2008, Tillen moved to Iceland to join Úrvalsdeild club Fram on a one-year contract. He had been recommended to try Icelandic football by his former Brentford teammate Ólafur Ingi Skúlason. Tillen remained at Fram for five seasons, making 170 appearances, scoring 19 goals and eventually becoming club captain. He departed the club in October 2012.

FH 
On 22 October 2012, Tillen moved to Úrvalsdeild club FH on a two-year contract. He had a good 2013 season, making 36 appearances and winning the Icelandic Super Cup, but he missed 11 months of football after breaking a leg in 2014 and he suffered a torn calf and a broken cheekbone and eye socket upon his return. He made just eight league appearances during FH's 2015 Úrvalsdeild title-winning season. Tillen was not in manager Heimir Guðjónsson's plans for the 2016 season and he spent the campaign away on loan. Tillen elected to retire from football in December 2016 and finished his FH career with 65 appearances and two goals.

Fram (loan) 
On 4 May 2016, Tillen dropped down to the 1. deild karla to return to Fram on loan for the 2016 season. His season was ended early due to a broken cheekbone suffered in August 2016 and he made 16 appearances in a mid-table season for the club. Across his two spells with Fram, Tillen made 186 appearances and scored 19 goals.

ÍH 
In August 2020, Tillen came out of retirement to join 4. deild karla club ÍH. During what remained of the 2020 season, he made five appearances and helped the club to promotion via the 4. deild karla promotion play-offs.

International career 
Tillen won caps for England in two 2004 European U19 Championship first qualifying round wins in September 2003. He made one appearance for the Football League U21 representative team in a 1–0 victory over Serie B U21 on 21 February 2006.

Coaching career 
Tillen began coaching the FH U12 team while recovering from a broken leg in 2014. After his retirement from football in 2016, Tillen became a full-time coach at FH. After returning to England, he joined the coaching team at Leicestershire Senior League Premier Division club Cottesmore in September 2022.

Personal life 
Tillen's brother Joe was also a professional footballer and the pair attended Newbury Athletic Club and later played together at Chelsea and Fram. He is married and after retiring from football, he settled in Iceland. Between 2012 and 2014, Tillen wrote a blog for fotbolti.net.

Career statistics

Honours 
FH

 Úrvalsdeild: 2015
 Icelandic League Cup: 2014
 Icelandic Super Cup: 2013
ÍH

 4. deild karla promotion play-offs: 2020

References

External links
 
 
 
 

1985 births
Living people
Sportspeople from Reading, Berkshire
English footballers
Association football fullbacks
Chelsea F.C. players
Brentford F.C. players
Knattspyrnufélagið Fram players
English expatriate sportspeople in Iceland
English Football League players
Expatriate footballers in Iceland
England youth international footballers
Fimleikafélag Hafnarfjarðar players
Association football midfielders
Úrvalsdeild karla (football) players
1. deild karla players
English expatriate footballers
Footballers from Berkshire